MFSB is the debut album by Philadelphia International Records houseband MFSB, released in 1973.

Reception

It also included instrumental covers of "Back Stabbers" by The O'Jays, "Family Affair" by Sly & The Family Stone, and "Freddie's Dead" by Curtis Mayfield.

The 2002 reissue on Epic/Legacy Records adds a live version of "TSOP (The Sound of Philadelphia)". The only single from the album was "Family Affair", having "Lay In Low", as a B-side. The third track, "Something for Nothing" was sampled by Groove Armada (feat. Jeru the Damaja) for their track Suntoucher, Tracey Lee on his 1997 album Many Facez with the song "Keep Your Hands High" featuring The Notorious B.I.G, as well as Jay-Z's 2003 song "What More Can I Say",  Canibus' song "How We Roll" and JoJo's "Breezy" from her debut album.

Track listing
"Freddie's Dead" (Curtis Mayfield) - 7:12
"Family Affair" (Sylvester Stewart)  - 4:21 
"Something for Nothing" (Kenneth Gamble, Roland Chambers, Thom Bell) - 2:59
"Back Stabbers" (Gene McFadden, John Whitehead, Leon Huff) - 6:30
"Lay In Low" (Leon Huff) - 3:43
"Poinciana" (Buddy Bernier, Nat Simon) - 5:50

2002 Reissue
"TSOP (The Sound of Philadelphia)" (Kenneth Gamble, Leon Huff) - 3:54

Personnel
MFSB
Bobby Eli, Norman Harris, Reggie Lucas, Roland Chambers, T.J. Tindall - guitar
Anthony Jackson, Ron Baker - bass
Leon Huff, Lenny Pakula, Eddie Green, Harold "Ivory" Williams - keyboards
Earl Young, Karl Chambers, Norman Farrington - drums
Larry Washington - percussion
Vincent Montana, Jr. - vibraphone
Zach Zachery, Tony Williams - saxophone
Don Renaldo and his Strings and Horns

Charts

References

External links
 

1973 debut albums
MFSB albums
Albums produced by Kenneth Gamble
Albums produced by Leon Huff
Philadelphia International Records albums
Albums recorded at Sigma Sound Studios